Ángela María Téllez-Girón y Duque de Estrada, 16th Duchess of Osuna, GE (1925–2015) was a Spanish noblewoman. She was a holder of ten grandeeships of Spain.

Early life 
Ángela María Téllez-Girón was born on February 7, 1925, to Mariano Téllez-Girón y Fernández de Córdoba, fifteenth Duke of Osuna, and Petra Duque de Estrada y Moreno.

Marriages and Issue 
On October 26, 1946, she married Pedro de Solís-Beaumont y Lasso de la Vega of the Marquises of Valencina and the Marquises of las Torres de la Presa. They were married in Espejo, Spain. The couple had two children: Ángela María de Solís-Beaumont y Téllez-Girón (XVII Duchess of Arcos), and María de la Gracia de Solís-Beaumont y Téllez-Girón (XIX Duchess of Plasencia). In 1959, Pedro de Solís-Beaumont y Lasso de la Vega died and Ángela Téllez-Girón became a widow. Four years later, on December 4, 1963, she was remarried. Her second husband was José María Latorre y Montalvo who was the 6th Marquis of Montemuzo and the 8th Marquis of Alcántara del Cuervo. Ángela had two daughters during her second marriage. Their first daughter was María del Pilar de la Torre y Téllez-Girón, who became the XV Duchess of Uceda; their second child was María de la Asunción de la Torre y Téllez-Girón, who became the Duchess of Medina de Rioseco and Countess of Salazar de Velasco.

Titles of Nobility 

 Duchess of Osuna (xvi duquesa de Osuna)
 Duchess of Medina de Rioseco (xx duquesa de Medina de Rioseco)
 Countess of Ureña (xx condesa de Ureña, de la casa de Osuna)
 Duchess of Escalona (xix duquesa de Escalona) 
 Marchioness of Villena (xix marquesa de Villena, de la casa de Pacheco;)
 Duchess of Arcos (xvi duquesa de Arcos, de la casa de Arcos;)
 Duchess of Gandía (xix duquesa de Gandía)
 Marquess of Lombay (xix marquesa de Lombay, de la casa de Gandía;)
 Countess-Duchess of Benavente (xvii condesa-duquesa de Benavente)
 Marchioness of Belmonte (xiv marquesa de Belmonte)
 Marchioness of Berlanga (xviii marquesa de Berlanga)
 Marchioness of Jabalquinto (xii marquesa de Jabalquinto)
 Marchioness of Frómista (xv marquesa de Frómista)
 Marchioness of Villar de Granjanejos (xiv marquesa del Villar de Grajanejos)
 Countess of Pinto (xv condesa de Pinto)
 Duchess of Medina de Rioseco (xii duquesa de Medina de Rioseco)
 Duchess of Uceda (xiv duquesa de Uceda)
 Countess of Oropesa (xx condesa de Oropesa)
 Countess of Peñaranda de Bracamonte (xvii condesa de Peñaranda de Bracamonte)
 Marchioness of Frechilla and Villarramiel (xviii marquesa de Frechilla y Villarramiel)
 Marchioness of Toral (xii marquesa de Toral)
 Countess of Alcuadete (xix condesa de Alcaudete)
 Countess of Fuensalida (xx condesa de Fuensalida)
 Countess of Puebla de Montalbán (xiii condesa de la Puebla de Montalbán)
 Lady of Espejo (xxviii señora de Espejo)

References 

20th-century Spanish nobility
2015 deaths
1925 births